The 2017 FC Dallas season is the club's 22nd season in Major League Soccer, the top tier of the United States soccer league system. Competitive fixtures began in February 2017, when FC Dallas began their matches in the knockout stages of the 2016–17 CONCACAF Champions League. The club kicked off their 2017 MLS season in March. Dallas entered the season as the defending U.S. Open Cup champions and Supporters' Shield holders, as well as the defending champions for the minor rivalry trophy, the Brimstone Cup.

Background 

FC Dallas is coming off the most successful season in franchise history, earning two major trophies during their 2016 campaign. Last season, the Hoops won the double, by winning the Supporters' Shield for the best regular season record, as well as the 2016 U.S. Open Cup, a domestic knockout competition open to all tiers of the U.S. soccer pyramid. FC Dallas additionally participated in the group stages of the 2016–17 CONCACAF Champions League where they finished atop their group over Guatemalan outfit, Suchitepéquez, and Nicaraguan outfit, Real Estelí. Argentine forward Maximiliano Urruti led Dallas in 2016 with 10 goals in league play and 13 goals across all competitions.

Transfers

In 

|}

Draft picks

Out

Roster 
As of August 9, 2017.

Out on loan

Competitions

Match results

Preseason

Midseason

Major League Soccer

Western Conference standings 
Western Conference

Overall standings

Results summary

Results by round

Regular season 
Kickoff times are in CDT (UTC-05) unless shown otherwise

U.S. Open Cup

CONCACAF Champions League (2016–17)

Group stage 

FC Dallas' group stage matches during the 2016–17 Champions League were played during the 2016 regular season.

Knockout stage

Quarterfinals

Semifinals

CONCACAF Champions League (2018) 

FC Dallas will not play Champions League fixtures until the 2018 season.

Statistics

Appearances 

Numbers outside parentheses denote appearances as starter.
Numbers in parentheses denote appearances as substitute.
Players with no appearances are not included in the list.

''

Goals and assists

Disciplinary record

Goalkeeper stats

Kits

See also 
 FC Dallas
 2017 in American soccer
 2017 Major League Soccer season

References

Dallas, FC
Dallas, FC
Dallas, FC
FC Dallas seasons